Messages from the Boys is the debut album by American R&B group the Boys (now known as Suns of Light). It was released in 1988.

Track listing
 "Dial My Heart" (Daryl Simmons, L.A. Reid, Babyface 4:25)
 "Lucky Charm" (Simmons, Reid, Babyface, Greg Scelsa 4:00)
 "A Little Romance" (Reid, Babyface, Sid Johnson, Bruce Robinson, Charles Muldrow Jr. 3:59)
 "Sunshine" (Eddie Watkins 3:00)
 "Love Gram" (Watkins, Otha Cole 4:10)
 "Just For the Fun of It" (Jeff Carruthers, Vincent Brantley 5:30)
 "Personality" (Watkins, Hakeem Abdulsamad 4:42)
 "Be My Girl" (Scelsa, the Boys, Craig Cooper 4:30)
 "Happy" (E. Watkins, Cole, Bee Jay Watkins 5:33)
 "Let's Dance" (E. Watkins 6:01)

Singles chart

"Dial My Heart" #1 R&B 1988 [#13 Pop]
"A Little Romance" #13 R&B
"Lucky Charm" #1 R&B 1989

References

1988 debut albums
The Boys (American band) albums
Albums produced by Babyface (musician)
Albums produced by L.A. Reid
Motown albums